Do You Remember Love is a 1985 American made-for-television drama film starring Joanne Woodward and Richard Kiley. It won three Emmy Awards, the Humanitas Prize, the Writers Guild of America Award, and a Peabody Award.

Synopsis
Barbara Wyatt-Hollis wins the hearts of her academic colleagues with her quick wit and irresistible but definitely quirky personality. Though popular with her students, she might not have gotten tenure if she were not a truly distinguished poet. Barbara has won many prizes and now has been nominated for the Longfellow Award, given only once a decade.

Barbara is lovingly married to George, who runs his own machine shop, and is more than happy to have Barbara as the star of the family. George couldn't be more proud when he learns that Barbara is a nominee for poetry's number-one award, which he's sure she'll win. In the midst of the excitement, Barbara's mother, Lorraine, breaks her hip. George suggests that Lorraine convalesce at Barbara and George's home. Uneasy about that, Barbara agrees.

It starts with Lorraine discovering that Barbara's sugar bowl is full of salt. Lorraine notices a lot of odd little things about Barbara's behavior. The main thing is that her daughter is uncharacteristically quick to anger. Lorraine asks George if he hasn't noticed the changes in Barbara, but he brushes it off. But George has indeed noticed the changes in Barbara and is most troubled by her temper, which has always had an edge, but seems now to be careening out of control. One evening she gets so angry during a squabble that she bites her husband.

George talks to his campus-psychiatrist friend, who observes Barbara at a party and tells George of a specialist he knows.  Barbara agrees that something may be wrong.  After many tests, the specialist concludes through the process of elimination that Barbara has Alzheimer's. In an effort to cope with a mind that is constantly losing things, Barbara begins to put labels, instructions, and reminders, everywhere—on bottles, doors, the telephone. George discovers a note she has been carrying up her sleeve. On it, Barbara has written "George".

One day, George finds a letter among Barbara's gardening tools. It is the notification that Barbara has won the Longfellow Award. It requests that Barbara accept her prize at an awards ceremony and, of course, deliver an acceptance speech. Barbara's son argues that his mother shouldn't say anything at the ceremony because she'll make a fool of herself. But Barbara is determined not only to go but to read the acceptance speech that she, herself, will write.

On the night of the awards presentation, Barbara forgets some friends' names but seems to have summoned up every unused bit of mental acuity she has. When the emcee finishes introducing Barbara, all eyes are on her, waiting for her to take her place in history. Barbara goes to the podium, but then freezes. Her mind betrays her.  Realizing that Barbara cannot make her speech, George goes quickly to the podium and introduces himself. George tells the audience that Barbara has Alzheimer's disease and that he will read the words that Barbara has written. It's all he can do to hold it together when he gets to the end of his wife's speech: "I've lived better than anyone I know. I've had the rare chance to say every damn thing I ever wanted to say. And people listened. Most of all I have been loved. As laughter is our purest invention, love is our purest gift. Though I have forgotten many things, I do still remember love."

Reception 
Following its broadcast in 1985, the film was honored with the Emmy Award for Outstanding Drama/Comedy Special. Vickie Patik was honored with the Emmy Award for Outstanding Writing in a Limited Series or a Special, as well as the Writers Guild Award for Original Drama Anthropology. Joanne Woodward received the Emmy Award for Outstanding Lead Actress in a Drama or Comedy Special Emmy for her role as Barbara Wyatt-Hollis. Additional honors include the Humanitas Prize and the Peabody Award.

Cast
 Joanne Woodward as Barbara Wyatt-Hollis
 Richard Kiley as George Hollis
 Geraldine Fitzgerald as Lorraine Wyatt
 Jerry Hardin as Dave McDonough
 Ron Rifkin as Gerry Kaplan
 Jim Metzler as Tom Hollis
 Andrea Barber as Jennifer
 Judith Barsi as Kathleen

Production
 Jeff Bleckner, director
 Vickie Patik, screenwriter
 Dave Bell, executive producer
 Marilyn Hall, co-executive producer
 Walter Halsey Davis, co-producer
 James Thompson, producer
 Wayne Threm, producer
 David Shire, original music

References

External links
 

1985 television films
1985 films
1985 drama films
1980s American films
1980s English-language films
American drama television films
CBS network films
Films directed by Jeff Bleckner
Films scored by David Shire
Primetime Emmy Award for Outstanding Made for Television Movie winners